Bewdley was the name of a constituency of the House of Commons of the Parliament of the United Kingdom from 1605 until 1950.  Until 1885 it was a parliamentary borough in Worcestershire, represented by one Member of Parliament; the name was then transferred to a county constituency from 1885 until 1950. Its MPs included the former Prime Minister Stanley Baldwin, who represented the seat from 1908 to 1937, and afterwards took the name of the constituency as part of his title when he was raised to the peerage.

Boundaries
1885-1918: The Boroughs of Bewdley and Worcester, the Sessional Divisions of Hundred House, Tenbury, and Worcester, and part of the Sessional Divisions of Malvern and Stourport.

1918-1950: The Borough of Bewdley, the Urban Districts of Malvern and Stourport, the Rural Districts of Hartley, Rock, Tenbury, and Upton-on-Severn, the Rural District which consisted of the parishes of Redmarley D'Abitot and Staunton, and in the Rural District of Tewkesbury the parishes of Chaceley and Pendock.

History

The unreformed borough (1605–1832)
Bewdley was enfranchised in 1605, being one of only a handful of English boroughs electing one rather than two MPs. The borough consisted of part of Ribbesford parish in Worcestershire, of which the market town of Bewdley was the main settlement. In 1831, the population of the borough was 3,908, and contained 891 houses.

The right to vote was exercised by the bailiff and burgesses (members of the town corporation, who need not necessarily be resident in the borough); this normally amounted to only 13 voters, though the report to Parliament before the Reform Act recorded the electorate as 42. (The discrepancy is perhaps academic, since it was many years since there had been a contested election.)

In the second half of the 17th century, the inhabitants at large made several attempts to secure the right to vote by petitioning against the election results, but in each case the Commons upheld the restrictive provisions of the original grant. The corporation were entitled to nominate their own successors, meaning in theory that their power was self-sustaining. However, in the early 18th century this was circumvented by issuing a new Royal charter for the borough that extinguished the existing corporation and appointed a new one. In 1708 the Whig government had a new charter issued to eject the existing Tory-dominated corporation, and at that year's election both the old and new corporations attempted to exercise their right to vote; the Whig majority in the Commons upheld the new charter and seated the Whig candidate. After the 1710 election, however, the Whig government had lost its Commons majority and the new House declared the charter of 1708 void and the Tory candidate victorious. However, the repeal of the charter could only be secured through recourse to the courts, and although an action was begun it appears that the various parties made up their political differences before it reached a conclusion, and all sides eventually acquiesced in the new corporation's legitimacy.

For most of Bewdley's existence as a borough until the Reform Act, the corporation (and therefore the choice of its MP) was under the influence of one or other prominent local families. In the mid-17th century this control was exercised by the Foley family, but after they acquired a hold on nearby Droitwich (which elected two MPs) their interest in Bewdley seems to have waned – possibly because in Droitwich they were able to secure legal ownership of the voting rights, whereas in Bewdley they had to proceed by bribery. (In 1677, the Commons upheld a petition against Thomas Foley's election on grounds of bribery, and declared his opponent duly elected in his place.) At later periods the "patronage" was held alternately by the Lytteltons and the Winningtons; but from 1806 the influence passed to a local attorney, Wilson Roberts.

The reformed borough (1832–1885)
Under the Reform Act 1832, which liberalised the franchise, Bewdley's boundaries were also extended to take in the whole of Ribbesford parish; this brought six hamlets into the borough, and almost doubled the population to 7,500. This new constituency had 337 electors qualified to vote in 1832, and the second extension of the franchise with a further expansion of the borough boundaries in 1867 increased this to just over 1,000.  At this period, elections were sometimes uncontested when the candidate was the head of the locally influential Winnington family, but otherwise were generally close-run affairs with the winning majority frequently under 20.

The county division (1885–1950)
The borough was too small to retain separate representation after the Third Reform Act, and was abolished with effect from the general election of 1885; however, the Bewdley name was transferred to the new county division in which the town was placed, formally called The Western or Bewdley Division of Worcestershire. This new constituency comprised the whole of the western half of the county, largely rural but including the town of Great Malvern, which contributed about a third of the population; the Worcester freeholders (who were entitled to a county vote even though their property was within the borough boundaries) also voted here. It was a very safe Conservative seat. Alfred Baldwin was elected as MP in 1892, holding the seat until his death in 1908. He was succeeded by his son, Stanley, who later became Prime Minister while still Bewdley's MP.

The constituency (now simply the Worcestershire, Bewdley Division) was redrawn in 1918, its southern end being transferred to the Evesham seat and acquiring instead part of the north-western corner of the county including Stourport, previously in the abolished Droitwich division. These changes had little effect on the political complexion of Bewdley, and Baldwin generally secured twice as many votes as his nearest opponent, when the constituency was contested at all – indeed, in three of the five elections he fought as Prime Minister Bewdley returned him unopposed.

The Bewdley division was abolished with effect from the general election of 1950, being divided between the Kidderminster constituency (in which Bewdley itself was placed) and Worcestershire South (which included Malvern).

Members of Parliament

Bewdley borough 1605–1885

Bewdley county division 1885–1950

Elections

Elections in the 1830s

Elections in the 1840s

Ireland's election was declared void on petition due to bribery and corrupt treating, causing a by-election.

Elections in the 1850s

Elections in the 1860s

The election was declared void on petition on grounds of bribery.

This by-election was also subject to petition. On scrutiny, Cunliffe was unseated and Anson was named MP in his place.

Elections in the 1870s

Elections in the 1880s 

The result was declared void on petition, causing a by-election.

Elections in the 1890s

Elections in the 1900s

Elections in the 1910s 

General Election 1914–15:

Another General Election was required to take place before the end of 1915. The political parties had been making preparations for an election to take place and by the July 1914, the following candidates had been selected; 
Unionist: Stanley Baldwin
Liberal:

Elections in the 1920s

Elections in the 1930s

Elections in the 1940s 
A General election was due to take place before the end of 1940, but was postponed due to the Second World War. By 1939, the following candidates had been selected to contest this constituency; 
Conservative: Roger Conant
Liberal: Donald Johnson

Notes

References
D. Brunton & D. H. Pennington, Members of the Long Parliament (London: George Allen & Unwin, 1954)
Cobbett's Parliamentary history of England, from the Norman Conquest in 1066 to the year 1803 (London: Thomas Hansard, 1808) 
 F. W. S. Craig, British Parliamentary Election Results 1832–1885 (2nd edition, Aldershot: Parliamentary Research Services, 1989)
 F W S Craig, British Parliamentary Election Results 1918–1949 (Glasgow: Political Reference Publications, 1969)
 T. H. B. Oldfield, The Representative History of Great Britain and Ireland (London: Baldwin, Cradock & Joy, 1816)
 Henry Pelling, Social Geography of British Elections 1885–1910 (London: Macmillan, 1967)
 J Holladay Philbin, Parliamentary Representation 1832 – England and Wales (New Haven: Yale University Press, 1965)
 Frederic A Youngs, jr, Guide to the Local Administrative Units of England, Vol II (London: Royal Historical Society, 1991)

Constituencies of the Parliament of the United Kingdom established in 1605
Constituencies of the Parliament of the United Kingdom disestablished in 1950
Constituencies of the Parliament of the United Kingdom represented by a sitting Prime Minister
Rotten boroughs
Parliamentary constituencies in Worcestershire (historic)
Bewdley